Wild Colombia with Nigel Marven is a four-part British nature educational series, first broadcast on Eden Channel in November 2012. The series is presented by wildlife adventurer Nigel Marven, who explores the wilds of Colombia. He visits the Andes, the Amazon rainforest, Llanos, and both the Caribbean and Pacific coasts.

International broadcast 
The series premiered on Eden in the United Kingdom. In New Zealand, TV3 has shown the series, in Europe Spektrum TV has shown the program, and in India it aired on Animal Planet. In Canada it was shown on Discovery World and in Latin America it was shown on Discovery Channel.

Links 
 Wild Colombia with Nigel Marven on Eden Channel website
 Wild Colombia with Nigel Marven on TV3 website

Nature educational television series
2012 British television series debuts